Thoralf Nettelhorst Hognestad (born October 2, 1962 in Stavanger) is a former Norwegian curler and curling coach.

He works also as a sports TV-commentator for Eurosport and other TV-broadcasters.

Teams

Record as a coach of national teams

References

External links
 

Living people
1962 births
Sportspeople from Stavanger
Norwegian male curlers
Norwegian curling coaches